"The Air That I Breathe" is a song written by Albert Hammond and Mike Hazlewood, originally recorded by Hammond in 1972.

The Air That I Breathe may also refer to:

 "The Air That I Breathe", a song by All That Remains on the album The Fall of Ideals, 2006
 The Air I Breathe, a 2007 film directed by Jieho Lee